AZS Olsztyn, officially known for sponsorship reasons as Indykpol AZS Olsztyn, is a professional men's volleyball club based in Olsztyn in northeastern Poland, founded in 1950 as a university team (AZS), located near the University of Warmia and Mazury campus. The team plays in the top flight of Polish volleyball – PlusLiga. Five–time Polish Champion and seven–time Polish Cup winner; one of the most successful volleyball clubs in Poland.

Honours

Domestic
 Polish Championship
Winners (5): 1972–73, 1975–76, 1977–78, 1990–91, 1991–92

 Polish Cup
Winners (7): 1969–70, 1970–71, 1971–72, 1981–82, 1988–89, 1990–91, 1991–92

International
 CEV Cup
Silver (1): 1977–78

Club history

Team
As of 2022–23 season

Coaching staff
Players

Season by season

Former names

See also

External links
 Official website 
 Team profile at PlusLiga.pl 
 Team profile at Volleybox.net

Polish volleyball clubs
Sport in Olsztyn
Volleyball clubs established in 1950
1950 establishments in Poland